Vijay K. Garg is an American computer scientist and engineer, who is currently the Cullen Trust for Higher Education Endowed Professor #5 at the University of Texas at Austin.

References

Year of birth missing (living people)
Living people
University of Texas at Austin faculty
American computer scientists
University of California, Berkeley alumni
Indian computer scientists